Robert Rodriguez (born 1968) is a U.S. film director and screenwriter.

Robert Rodriguez may also refer to:

 Robert Rodríguez (boxer) (born 1990), Mexican American boxer
 Robert Rodriguez (gridiron football) (born 1981), American gridiron football coach
 Robert J. Rodriguez (born 1976), Democratic member of the New York State Assembly
 Robert Xavier Rodriguez (born 1946), American classical composer
 Robert N. Rodriguez, president of the American Statistical Association in 2012
 Robert Rodriguez (politician), Colorado state senator
 Robert John Rodriguez, American film and television producer
 Robert Neal Rodriguez (1950–1992), American serial killer and former police officer
Robert Rodriguez (physician), American emergency physician

See also 
Roberto Rodríguez (disambiguation)